The 2021 IMSA Prototype Challenge is the sixteenth season of the IMSA Lites series and its successors, and the fifth under the IMSA Prototype Challenge name. The season started on January 23 at Daytona International Speedway and concludes on November 12 at Michelin Raceway Road Atlanta.

Calendar
The provisional 2021 calendar was released on September 9, 2020. As of April 7, 2021 the calendar remains provisional and subject to change.

Calendar Changes
All races are now 1 hour 45 minutes in length.
Canadian Tire Motorsport Park (Mosport) returned to the calendar after being cancelled for 2020 due to the COVID-19 pandemic.
Road America, which replaced Mosport in 2020, did not return for 2021.
On April 7, 2021, Watkins Glen International replaced Canadian Tire Motorsport Park on the schedule due to COVID-19 restrictions. The new event is scheduled for July 2.

Series News
2020-spec LMP3 cars will be allowed to compete in the championship for 2021. 2015-spec cars are still allowed. The classes will be called LMP3–1 (2020) and LMP3–2 (2015).
Points will be awarded at 10x the amount awarded in 2020, points are still awarded down to 30th place.

Entries

Race results
Bold indicates to overall winner.

Championship standings

Points system

Driver's Championships

LMP3-1

LMP3-2

Team's Championships

LMP3-1

LMP3-2

Note #60 Wulver Racing after Round1 moved to LMP3-1 category.

Bronze Driver's Cup

LMP3-1

LMP3-2

References

External links
Official Website 
IMSA Website

IMSA Prototype Challenge